Lev Saakov (November 30, 1909 – March 10, 1988) was an Armenian screenwriter and film director of the Soviet era.

Selected filmography 
  (1985)
  (1979)
  (1972)
  (1968)
  (1966)
  (1961)
  (1959)
 Steppe Dawns (1953)
  (1934)

References

Bibliography 
 Vlada Petrić. Constructivism in Film - A Cinematic Analysis: The Man with the Movie Camera. Cambridge University Press, 2012.

External links 
 
 Lev Saakov on KinoPoisk 

1909 births
1988 deaths
People from Gyumri
Armenian film directors
Armenian screenwriters
Soviet screenwriters